The  was a Japan Ground Self-Defense Force (JGSDF) tracked armored mortar carrier that based on JGSDF Type 60 Armoured Personnel Carrier Type SU-II. The vehicle along with a parallel development of Type 60 107 mm self-propelled mortar. Its official abbreviation is 81MSP and also known as SV in the service. The vehicle had been phased out, with Type 60 107 mm self-propelled mortar since mid-to-late 1990s.

See also 
 Type 60 107 mm self-propelled mortar
 Type 96 120 mm self-propelled mortar

References

External links

Japan Ground Self-Defense Force
Tracked mortars
Armoured fighting vehicles of Japan
Artillery of Japan
Military vehicles introduced in the 1960s